The 1914 Italian Athletics Championships  were held in Milan. it was the 9th edition of the Italian Athletics Championships.

Men

References

External links 
 Italian Athletics Federation

1914 in athletics (track and field)
1914
1914 in Italian sport
Sports competitions in Milan